The 1989 ABC Under-18 Championship was the tenth edition of the Asian Championship for Junior Men. The tournament took place in Manila, Philippines from January 24 to February 1, 1989.

On July 19, 1988, the Basketball Association of the Philippines announced that the Philippines was given hosting rights for the tournament after the country bested bids by Malaysia, Jordan and Thailand for the hosting rights.

 successfully defended their title they won three years ago also held in Manila, this time after defeating  in the championship match.

Preliminary round
All times are in Philippine Standard Time (UTC+08:00)

Group A

Group B

Group C

Group D

*: Points based on two games only

Quarterfinal round

Group I

Group II

Group III

Group IV

Classification 5th–16th

15th place

13th place

11th place

9th place

7th place

5th place

Final round

Semifinals

3rd place

Final

Final standing

Awards

See Also
 1989 ABC Under-18 Championship for Women

References

FIBA Asia Under-18 Championship
1989 in Asian basketball
1989 in Philippine basketball
International basketball competitions hosted by the Philippines
January 1989 sports events in Asia
February 1989 sports events in Asia